California's 48th district may refer to:

 California's 48th congressional district
 California's 48th State Assembly district